Cage is a London-based advocacy organisation which aims to empower communities impacted by the War on Terror. Cage highlights and campaigns against state policies, developed as part of the War on Terror. The organisation was formed to raise awareness of the plight of detainees held at Guantánamo Bay and elsewhere and has worked closely with former detainees held by the United States and campaigns on behalf of current detainees held without trial.

Cage was formerly known as Cageprisoners, and is ordinarily styled as "CAGE".

Aims

Cage campaigns against torture, imprisonment without trial, 'draconian' anti-terror laws and similar issues. Human rights groups have also said that Cage is doing vital work. Cage has spoken out against the UK's anti-terrorism laws.

Cage offers support to those denied due process regarding terrorism offences through casework, advocacy and research. They document cases such as miscarriages of justice. Cage have developed trust of Muslims who have been subjected to torture, harassment and other abuses, by informing them of their rights and putting them in touch with lawyers. They have also campaigned for the release of hostages.

According to The Guardian newspaper, Cage's campaigns to help former detainees re-integrate into society have been praised by Cynthia Stroum, the US Ambassador to Luxembourg.

Background
Cage's website was launched in October 2003. It was among the leading organisations which worked on publicising the names of the detainees at Guantanamo. Due to refusal by the U.S. government to publish a list of names until a Freedom of Information lawsuit in 2006, it published names, photos and other information about detainees obtained from detainees' families The U.S. government's refusal impeded the efforts of lawyers who had wished to represent the detainees there.

Cage was formerly Cageprisoners Ltd, and is sometimes styled as "CAGE". 

Cage's outreach director, Moazzam Begg, is a Briton from Birmingham who was held for three years by the United States government in extrajudicial detention as a suspected enemy combatant at Bagram in Afghanistan, and the Guantánamo Bay detainment camp in Cuba. He was released without charge in 2005. He has worked to represent detainees still held at Guantánamo, as well as to help former detainees become re-integrated into society. He has also been working with governments to persuade them to accept non-national former detainees, some of whom have been refused entry by their countries of origin. Begg has played a crucial role in proving UK complicity in US imprisonment and torture in Bagram and elsewhere, and aided detainees seeking admission and compensation from the UK government.

Controversies and criticisms

Anwar al-Awlaki
After Anwar al-Awlaki's release from Yemeni detention in 2007, Cage invited the cleric to address their Ramadan fundraising dinners in August 2008 (at Wandsworth Civic Centre, South London, by videolink, as he was banned from entering the UK) and August 2009 at Kensington Town Hall. U.S. authorities claimed that Awlaki was a recruiter for Al-Qaeda in the Arabian Peninsula, and was involved in the radicalisation of terrorists such as Nidal Hassan, Umar Farouk Abdulmutallab, Zachary Adam Chesser, Faisal Shahzad, and Roshonara Choudry. He was killed by the US in a 2011 drone strike.

Michael Adebolajo 
Following the murder of Lee Rigby by Michael Adebalajo in May 2013, Cage reported that Adebolajo had suffered harassment from security services before the offence. A report by the Intelligence and Security Committee of the British parliament later confirmed that the British government may have been complicit in his treatment.

Mohamed Emwazi ('Jihadi John')
In February 2015, Mohamed Emwazi, a 27-year-old Briton, was identified as the probable masked beheader of civilian captives of ISIS in Syria. Emwazi had, between 2009 and January 2012, been in contact with Cage while in the UK, complaining that he was being harassed by British intelligence agencies. At a press conference the following day, Cage's research director, Asim Qureshi, said Emwazi had been "a beautiful young man" and "extremely kind, gentle and soft-spoken". In Qureshi's view, Emwazi's contact with the UK security services had contributed to his transformation into a killer.
Prime Minister David Cameron and Mayor of London Boris Johnson both decried the suggestion that Emwazi's radicalisation was the fault of British authorities. According to the BBC, "Human rights groups say they [Cage] are doing 'vital work' but critics have called the organisation 'apologists for terror'." The Labour Member of Parliament (MP) John Spellar encouraged charities which funded Cage to rethink in light of their recent comments. An article published in Open Democracy in July 2015 described media response in relation to Qureshi's comments as 'both overwrought and plainly misleading; not to mention a serious dereliction of the journalistic duty to hold power to account.'. Partly as a result of Qureshi's statement, the Charity Commission pressured charities that had previously funded Cage to cease doing so., but changed their position on this in October 2015. Following Emwazi's death in a drone strike in November 2015 in the Syrian Civil War, Cage was among those who expressed dissatisfaction that he had not been brought to trial.

Muhammad Rabbani conviction
On 25 September 2017, Muhammad Rabbani, the international director of Cage, was found guilty at Westminster Magistrates Court of having wilfully obstructed police at Heathrow Airport by refusing to divulge the passwords to his mobile phone and laptop computer. Rabbani was given a conditional discharge for 12 months and ordered to pay £620 costs. Rabbani had been stopped whilst returning from Qatar, where Rabbani said he had interviewed a man to collect evidence for UK lawyers of that man's claims of having been tortured while in US custody. On two previous occasions Rabbani had refused to hand over passwords at ports and airports and had been allowed to pass.

Gareth Peirce, Rabbani's solicitor, said the verdict would be challenged in the UK High Court. The verdict confirmed that UK police have the powers under Schedule 7 of the Terrorism Act 2000 to demand access to electronic devices. Rabbani claimed that he had been protecting the confidentiality of his client. Rabbani and Cage described the conviction as a "moral victory" against Schedule 7.

Charitable funding
Between 2007 and 2014, the Joseph Rowntree Charitable Trust gave grants to Cage totalling £271,250. In a similar period, the Roddick Foundation, founded by Anita Roddick, gave grants totalling £120,000. In 2015, following pressure from the UK government's Charity Commission, which had expressed concern that funding Cage risked damaging public confidence in charity, both entities agreed to cease funding Cage.

The Rowntree Trust defended its funding in a statement, commenting, "We believe (Cage) has played an important role in highlighting the ongoing abuses at Guantanamo Bay and at many other sites around the world, including many instances of torture". Cage said that the majority of their income comes from private individuals and that the group "would continue its work regardless of the criticism levelled at it ... even though we aren't a proselytizing organisation, we are a Muslim response to a problem that largely affects Muslims".

In October 2015, following an application for judicial review by Cage, the Charity Commission changed its position and said it would not in future interfere in the discretion of charities to choose to fund Cage. The judicial review heard evidence that Theresa Villiers, a British Cabinet Minister, and US intelligence had both applied pressure on the charity commission to investigate Cage, with US intelligence agents describing Cage as a "jihadist front".

Zakat
In 2014, Cage held an online discussion about Zakat (the Muslim religious obligation for charitable giving) and the Muslim obligation to prisoners. It appealed to Muslims to make donations to help free those unjustly imprisoned in Guantánamo and elsewhere.

Libel case against The Times
In December 2020, Cage and Moazzam Begg received damages of £30,000 plus costs in a libel case they had brought against The Times newspaper. In June 2020, a report in The Times had suggested that Cage and Begg were supporting a man who had been arrested in relation to a knife attack in Reading in which three men were murdered. The Times report also suggested that Cage and Begg were excusing the actions of the accused man by mentioning mistakes made by the police and others. In addition to paying damages, The Times printed an apology. Cage stated that the damages amount would be used to "expose state-sponsored Islamophobia and those complicit with it in the press. ... The Murdoch press empire has actively supported xenophobic elements and undermined principles of open society and accountability. ... We will continue to shine a light on war criminals and torture apologists and press barons who fan the flames of hate".

See also
 Andy Worthington
 Reprieve UK
 Scotland Against Criminalising Communities

External links 

 Qur'an Desecration Report

References

Prison-related organizations
Islam in the United Kingdom
Advocacy groups in the United Kingdom
2003 establishments in the United Kingdom
Organizations established in 2003
War on terror